Alan Teasdale (born 15 July 1944) is a former Australian rules footballer who played for the Geelong Football Club in the Victorian Football League (VFL).

Notes

External links 

Living people
1944 births
Australian rules footballers from Victoria (Australia)
Geelong Football Club players